Mukundan is an Indian name that may refer to:

Mukundan C. Menon (1948–2005), Indian human rights activist
M. Mukundan (born 1942), Indian writer
Niranjan Mukundan (born 1994), Indian para-swimmer
Unni Mukundan (born 1987), Indian actor
Mukundan (actor), Malayalam actor

Indian surnames